Elisenda Fábregas (born 1955 in Terrassa, Province of Barcelona, Spain) is a Spanish/American Composer.

Biography
Fábregas studied piano at the Conservatory of Barcelona until 1978. She came to the USA and studied for her bachelor's and master's degree (1983) in piano performance at Juilliard School of Music with Beveridge Webster and Joseff Raieff and Samuel Sanders. She made her debut in the Carnegie Recital Hall in 1983.

She received doctorates from Columbia University Teachers College in education (1992) and Peabody Institute of the Johns Hopkins University in music composition (2011).

As a pianist she performed besides in Spain, in various countries, England, Korea, Japan, China, Taiwan, and the United States.

In 2021 she lives in Seoul, South Korea, and is working as invited professor of music and cultural studies at Kyung Hee University.

Award
Fábregas received the Shepherd Distinguished Composer of the Year Award at the Music Teachers National Association Convention in Washington D.C. in 2001.

Works
Fábregas composed more than forty works for solo, chamber ensemble, vocal, chorus and orchestra. She composed several large-scale piano works like Mirage (1997), Portraits I (2000), Hommage for Mompou (2006), and Hommage for Mozart (2006).
Five Songs (On poems by Federico García Lorca) for soprano and piano, 1986
Variaciones para Orquesta, 1990
Five Poems of García Lorca for soprano, cello, clarinet and violin, 1992
Sonata No. 1 for violin and piano, 1994
Sonata No. 2 for violin and piano, 1995
Andante Appassionato for solo flute, 1996
Sonata No. 1 for flute and piano, 1996
Mirage for piano, 1997
Lyric scenes for the young for piano, 1999
Portraits II for clarinet, violin, cello and piano, 1999
Cinco Soledades (on poems by Antonio Machado) for basbariton and piano, 1999-2004
Portraits I for piano, 2000
Winged serpent for clarinet and piano, 2001
Bonna Domna for string orchestra and choir, 2001–04
Album for the Young for piano, 2002
Five musings for soprano and piano, 2002
Village Scenes for soprano and piano, 2002
Voces de mi tierra for flute, cello and piano, 2003
Miniatures for the Young for piano, 2004
Moments of change for mezzo-soprano and piano, 2004–05
Hommage a Mozart for piano, 2005
Moments of change (poems by Margaret Atwood) for soprano and piano, 2005
Colores Andaluces for cello and pianor, 2006
Homenaje a Mompou for piano, 2007
The Flaming Rock (La Roca llameante) for choir and string quartet, 2007
Tu i els meus somnis (poems by Josep Janes) for mezzo-soprano and piano, 2007
Goyescas (inspired by Goya. for flute and guitar, 2008
Voices of the Rainforest for flute, cello and piano, 2008
Gacelas de amor (poems by Federico García Lorca) for soprano, flute and piano, 2009
Solitary for baritone, clarinet, cello and piano, 2009
Concerto for Violoncello and Orchestra, 2010
Terra Mater for Symphony Orchestra, 2011
Retorn a la terra (Return to the homeland, poems by Josep Carner and Joan Maragall) for narrator, clarinet, bassoon, trumpet, trombone, percussion, violin, and double bass, 2012. 
Caminos del duende for marimba and percussion, 2012
Symphony No. 1 for Symphonic Band, 2014

References

External links
Official Website
Youtube recording of Retorn a la terra, Narrated by Elisenda Fabragas and Yoo Jeong Hoon

Spanish classical pianists
Spanish women pianists
Composers from Catalonia
Living people
1955 births
Women classical composers
American women classical pianists
American classical pianists
Juilliard School alumni
Teachers College, Columbia University alumni
Peabody Institute alumni
Spanish women classical composers
20th-century classical composers
20th-century Spanish musicians
20th-century classical pianists
21st-century classical composers
21st-century classical pianists
20th-century women composers
21st-century women composers
20th-century Spanish women
21st-century American women